Maria Angelica Ayala, also known as Ina Ayala, is a Filipina dressage rider. Her best result was at the 2013 FEI World Dressage Challenge when she finish first at the medium category of Zone 9, with her horse Saigon. She also finished fourth at the advance category at the same tournament.

References

Living people
1964 births
Filipino female equestrians
Filipino dressage riders